Kimchi, is a traditional Korean side dish of salted and fermented vegetables, such as napa cabbage and Korean radish. A wide selection of seasonings are used, including gochugaru (Korean chili powder), spring onions, garlic, ginger, and jeotgal (salted seafood), etc. Kimchi is also used in a variety of soups and stews. As a staple food in Korean cuisine, it is eaten as a side dish with almost every Korean meal.

There are hundreds of different types of kimchi made with different vegetables as the main ingredients. Traditionally, winter kimchi, called kimjang, was stored in large earthenware fermentation vessels, called onggi, in the ground to prevent freezing during the winter months and to keep it cool enough to slow down the fermentation process during summer months. The vessels are also kept outdoors in special terraces called jangdokdae. In contemporary times, household kimchi refrigerators are more commonly used.

Etymology

Ji 
The term ji, which has its origins in archaic Korean dihi, has been used to refer to kimchi since ancient times. The sound change can be roughly described as:
 dihi > di > ji
The Middle Korean form dihi is found in several books from Joseon (1392–1897). In Modern Korean, the word remains as the suffix -ji in the standard language (as in jjanji, seokbak-ji), and as the suffix -ji as well as the noun ji in Gyeongsang and Jeolla dialects. The unpalatalized form di is preserved in P'yŏngan dialect.

Kimchi 
Kimchi is the accepted word in both North and South Korean standard languages. Earlier forms of the word include timchɑi, a Middle Korean transcription of the Sino-Korean word  (literally "submerged vegetable"). Timchɑi appears in Sohak Eonhae, the 16th century Korean rendition of the Chinese book, Xiaoxue. Sound changes from Middle Korean to Modern Korean regarding the word can be described as:
 timchɑi > dimchɑi > jimchɑi > jimchui >  gimchi

The aspirated first consonant of timchae became unaspirated in dimchɑe, then underwent palatalization in jimchɑe. The word then became jimchui with the loss of the vowel ɑ in Korean language, then Kimchi, with the depalatalized word-initial consonant. In Modern Korean, the hanja characters  are pronounced chimchae, and are not used to refer to kimchi, or anything else. The word Kimchi is not considered as a Sino-Korean word. Older forms of the word are retained in many regional dialects: jimchae (Jeolla, Hamgyŏng dialects), jimchi (Chungcheong, Gangwon, Gyeonggi, Gyeongsang, Hamgyŏng, Jeolla dialects), and dimchi (P'yŏngan dialect).

The English word "kimchi" perhaps originated from kimch'i, the McCune–Reischauer transcription of the Korean word Kimchi.

History

Early history 
Samguk Sagi, a historical record of the Three Kingdoms of Korea, mentions the pickle jar used to ferment vegetables, which indicates that fermented vegetables were commonly eaten during this time. During the Silla dynasty (57 BC – AD 935), kimchi became prevalent as Buddhism caught on throughout the nation and fostered a vegetarian lifestyle. 

The pickling of vegetables was an ideal method, prior to refrigerators, that helped to preserve the lifespan of foods. In Korea, kimchi was made during the winter by fermenting vegetables, and burying it in the ground in traditional brown ceramic pots called onggi. This labor further allowed a bonding among women within the family. A poem on Korean radish written by Yi Gyubo, a 13th-century literatus, shows that radish kimchi was a commonplace in Goryeo (918–1392).

Kimchi has been a staple in Korean culture, but historical versions were not a spicy dish. Early records of kimchi do not mention garlic or chili pepper. Chili peppers, now a standard ingredient in kimchi, had been unknown in Korea until the early seventeenth century due to its being a New World crop. Chili peppers, originally native to the Americas, were introduced to East Asia by Portuguese traders. The first mention of chili pepper is found in Jibong yuseol, an encyclopedia published in 1614. Sallim gyeongje, a 17‒18th century book on farm management, wrote on kimchi with chili peppers. However, it was not until the 19th century that the use of chili peppers in kimchi was widespread. Recipes from the early 19th century closely resemble today's kimchi.

A 1766 book, Jeungbo sallim gyeongje, reports kimchi varieties made with myriad ingredients, including chonggak-kimchi (kimchi made with chonggak radish), oi-sobagi (with cucumber), seokbak-ji (with jogi-jeot), and dongchimi. However, napa cabbage was introduced to Korea only at the end of 19th century, and whole-cabbage kimchi similar to its current form is described in Siuijeonseo, a cookbook published around that time.

Modern history 
During South Korea's involvement in the Vietnam War the industrialization and commercialization of kimchi production became increasingly important because the Korean government wanted to provide rations for its troops. The Korean government requested American help to ensure that South Korean troops, reportedly "desperate" for the food, could obtain it in the field.

In 2008, South Korean scientists created a special low-calorie, vitamin-rich "space kimchi" for Yi So-yeon, the first Korean astronaut, to take to space. It was bacteria-free, unlike normal Kimchi in which bacteria are essential for fermentation. It was feared that cosmic rays might mutate the bacteria.

South Korea developed programs for adult Korean adoptees to return to South Korea and learn about what it means to be Korean. One of these programs was learning how to make kimchi.

1996 kimchi standard dispute with Japan 
In 1996, Korea protested against Japanese commercial production of kimchi arguing that the Japanese-produced product (kimuchi) was different from kimchi. In particular, Japanese kimchi was not fermented and more similar to asazuke. Korea lobbied for an international standard from the Codex Alimentarius, an organization associated with the World Health Organization that defines voluntary standards for food preparation for international trade purposes. In 2001, the Codex Alimentarius published a voluntary standard defining kimchi as "a fermented food that uses salted napa cabbages as its main ingredient mixed with seasonings, and goes through a lactic acid production process at a low temperature", but which neither specified a minimum amount of fermentation nor forbade the use of any additives. Following the inclusion of the kimchi standard, kimchi exports in Korea did increase, but so did the production of kimchi in China and the import of Chinese kimchi into Korea.

2010 Kimchi ingredient price crisis 
Due to heavy rainfall shortening the harvesting time for cabbage and other main ingredients for kimchi in 2010, the price of kimchi ingredients and kimchi itself rose greatly. Korean and international newspapers described the rise in prices as a national crisis. Some restaurants stopped offering kimchi as a free side dish, which The New York Times compared to an American hamburger restaurant no longer offering free ketchup. In response to the kimchi price crisis, the South Korean government announced the temporary reduction of tariffs on imported cabbage to coincide with the kimjang season.

Intangible Cultural Heritage of Humanity 
Kimchi-related items have been inscribed on UNESCO's Representative List of the Intangible Cultural Heritage of Humanity by both South and North Korea. This makes kimchi the second intangible heritage that was submitted by two countries, the other one being the folk song "Arirang" which was also submitted by both the Koreas.

Submitted by South Korea (inscribed 2013) 
Kimjang, the tradition of making and sharing kimchi that usually takes place in late autumn, was added to the list as "Gimjang, making and sharing kimchi in the Republic of Korea". The practice of Gimjang reaffirms Korean identity and strengthens family cooperation. Gimjang is also an important reminder for many Koreans that human communities need to live in harmony with nature.

Submitted by North Korea (inscribed 2015) 
North Korean kimchi-making was inscribed on the list in December 2015 as "Tradition of kimchi-making in the Democratic People's Republic of Korea". North Korean kimchi tends to be less spicy and red than South Korean kimchi. Seafood is used less often and less salt is added. Additional sugar is used to help with fermentation in the cold climate.

Kimchi Day

In the United States, states California, Virginia, Maryland and New York, and capital city Washington D.C. have issued proclamations declaring November 22 as 'Kimchi Day' to recognize the importance of the dish as part of Korean culture.

2012 effective ban by China of Korean kimchi imports 
Since 2012, the Chinese government has effectively banned the import of Korean kimchi through government regulations. Ignoring the standards of kimchi outlined by the Codex Alimentarius, China defined kimchi as a derivative of one of its own cuisines, called pao cai. However, due to significantly different preparation techniques from pao cai, kimchi has significantly more lactic acid bacteria through its fermentation process, which exceeds China's regulations. Since 2012, commercial exports of Korean kimchi to China has reached zero; the only minor amounts of exports accounting for Korean kimchi are exhibition events held in China.

Boycott in China 
A 2017 article in The New York Times said that anti-Korean sentiment in China has risen after South Korea's acceptance of the deployment of THAAD in South Korea, government-run Chinese news media has encouraged the boycott of South Korean goods, and Chinese nationalists have vowed to not eat kimchi. The move was criticized by other Chinese nationalists, who noted that China officially considered Koreans an integral ethnic group in the multinational state, and that kimchi is also indigenous to the Koreans in the Yanbian Korean Autonomous Prefecture.

2020 kimchi origin dispute with China 
In November 2020, the International Organization for Standardization (ISO) posted ISO 24220:2020, new regulations for the making of pao cai. The same month, BBC News reported that Chinese news organization Global Times claimed the new ISO standard was "an international standard for the kimchi industry led by China" despite the standard clearly stating "this document does not apply to kimchi". This sparked strong anger from South Korean media and people, as well as the responses from some Chinese people who argued China held the right to claim Kimchi as their own. 

After the controversy emerged, Global Times explained the controversy as the "misunderstanding in translation", and stated that "Kimchi refers to a kind of fermented cabbage dish that plays an integral role in Korean cuisine, while pàocài, or Sichuan pàocài, refers to pickled vegetables that are popular originally in Southwest China's Sichuan Province, but now in most parts of northern China." Global Times also reported that Baidu Baike, the Chinese online encyclopedia, removed the controversial phrase "Korean kimchi originated from China" after the request. The South Korean Ministry of Culture, Sports and Tourism subsequently presented the guidelines to set the term "xīnqí (辛奇)" as the new proper Chinese translation of Kimchi while "pàocài" was an acceptable translation prior to the controversy.

Ingredients 

Kimchi varieties are determined by the main vegetable ingredients and the mix of seasoning used to flavor the kimchi.

Vegetables 
For many families, the pungent and often spicy meal is a source of pride and recalls the taste of a good home. Cabbages (napa cabbages, bomdong, headed cabbages) and radishes (Korean radishes, ponytail radishes, gegeol radishes, yeolmu radishes) are the most commonly used kimchi vegetables. Other kimchi vegetables include: aster, balloon flower roots, burdock roots, celery, chamnamul, cilantro, cress, crown daisy greens, cucumber, eggplant, garlic chives, garlic scapes, ginger, Korean angelica-tree shoots, Korean parsley, Korean wild chive, lotus roots, mustard greens, onions, perilla leaves, bamboo shoot, momordica charantia, pumpkins, radish greens, rapeseed leaves, scallions, seaweed,  soybean sprouts, spinach, sugar beets, sweet potato vines, and tomatoes.

Seasonings 
Brining salt (with a larger grain size compared to kitchen salt) is used mainly for initial salting of kimchi vegetables. Being minimally processed, it serves to help develop flavors in fermented foods. Cabbage is usually salted twice when making spicy kimchi.

Commonly used seasonings include gochugaru (chili powder), scallions, garlic, ginger, and jeotgal (salted seafood) Jeotgal can be replaced with raw seafood in colder Northern parts of the Korean peninsula. If used, milder saeu-jeot (salted shrimp) or jogi-jeot (salted croaker) is preferred and the amount of jeotgal is also reduced in Northern and Central regions. In Southern Korea, on the other hand, generous amount of stronger myeolchi-jeot (salted anchovies) and galchi-jeot (salted hairtail) is commonly used. Raw seafood or daegu-agami-jeot (salted cod gills) are used in the East coast areas.

Salt, scallions, garlic, fish sauce, and sugar are commonly added to flavor the kimchi.

Production
The first step in the making of any kimchi is to slice the cabbage or daikon into smaller, uniform pieces to increase the surface area. The pieces are then coated with salt as a preservative method, as this draws out the water to lower the free water activity. This inhibits the growth of undesirable microorganisms by limiting the water available for them to utilize for growth and metabolism. The salting stage can use 5 to 7% salinity for 12 hours, or 15% for 3 to 7 hours. 

The excess water is then drained away, and seasoning ingredients are added. The sugar that is sometimes added also acts to bind free water that still remains, further reducing free water activity. Finally, the brined vegetables are placed into an airtight canning jar and left to sit for 24 to 48 hours at room temperature. The ideal salt concentration during the fermentation process is about 3%. 

Since the fermentation process results in the production of carbon dioxide, the jar should be "burped" daily to release the gas. The more fermentation that occurs, the more carbon dioxide will be incorporated, which results in a very carbonated-drink-like effect.

Microorganisms in kimchi 
The microorganisms present in kimchi include Bacillus mycoides, B. pseudomycoides, B. subtilis, Lactobacillus brevis, Lb. curvatus, Lb. kimchii, Lb. parabrevis, Lb. pentosus, Lb. plantarum, Lb. sakei, Lb. spicheri, Lactococcus carnosum, Lc. gelidum, Lc. lactis, Leuconostoc carnosum, Ln. citreum, Ln. gasicomitatum, Ln. gelidum, Ln. holzapfelii, Ln. inhae, Ln. kimchii, Ln. lactis, Ln. mesenteroides, Serratia marcescens, Weissella cibaria, W. confusa, W. kandleri, W. kimchii. W. koreensis, and W. soli. Archaea and yeasts, such as Saccharomyces, Candida, Pichia, and Kluyveromyces are also present in kimchi, with the latter being responsible for undesirable white colonies that sometimes form in the product as well as food spoilages and off-flavors.

In early fermentation stages, the Leuconostoc variety is found more dominantly in kimchi fermentation because of its lower acid tolerance and microaerophilic properties; the Leuconostoc variety also grows better at low salt concentrations. Throughout the fermentation process, as acidity rises, the Lactobacillus and Weissella variety become dominant because of their higher acid tolerance. Lactobacillus also grows better in conditions with a higher salt concentration.

These microorganisms are present due to the natural microflora provided by utilizing unsterilized food materials in the production of kimchi. The step of salting the raw materials as well as the addition of red pepper powder inhibit the pathogenic and putrefactive bacteria present in the microflora, allowing the lactic acid bacteria (LAB) to flourish and become the dominant microorganism. These anaerobic microorganisms steadily increase in number during the middle stages of fermentation, and prefer to be kept at low temperatures of about 10℃, pH of 4.2-4, and remain in the presence of 1.5% - 4% NaCl. A faster fermentation at a higher temperature may be chosen as well to accelerate the growth of bacterial cultures for a faster decrease in pH level.

Since the raw cruciferous vegetables themselves are the source of LAB required for fermentation, no starter culture is required for the production of kimchi; rather, spontaneous fermentation occurs. The total population of microorganisms present at the beginning of processing determine the outcome of fermentation, causing the final product to be highly variable in terms of quality and flavor. Currently, there are no recommended approaches to control the microbial community during fermentation to predict the outcome. In the industrial production of kimchi, starter cultures made up of Leu. mesenteroides, Leu. citreum, and Lb. plantarum are used, which are often unsuccessful because they fail to outcompete the naturally occurring cultures on the raw materials.

By-products of microorganisms 
The lactic acid bacteria (LAB) produce lactic acid, hydrogen peroxide, and carbon dioxide as by-products during metabolism. Lactic acid quickly lowers the pH, creating an acidic environment that is uninhabitable for most other microorganisms that survived salting. This also modifies the flavor of sub-ingredients and can increase the nutritive value of the raw materials, as the microbial community in the fermentation process can synthesize B vitamins and hydrolyze cellulose in plant tissues to free nutrients that are normally indigestible by the human gastrointestinal tract. Hydrogen peroxide is formed by the oxidation of reduced nicotinamide adenine dinucleotide (NADH) and provides an antibiotic to inhibit some undesirable microorganisms. Carbon dioxide functions as a preservative, flushing out oxygen to create an anaerobic environment, as well as creating the desired carbonation in the final product.

Odor 
Kimchi is known for its strong, spicy, flavors and odors, although milder varieties exist. Variations in the fermentation process cause the final product to be highly variable in terms of quality and flavor. The strong odor is especially tied to the sulfur compounds from garlic and ginger of kimchi, which can be less appealing to non-Koreans. Thus, scientists are experimenting with the types of bacteria used in its production to minimize the odor to increase the appeal for international markets. These efforts are not universally appreciated by lovers of kimchi, as the flavor is affected in the process, and some see that "South Korea's narrative about its own culinary staple" is being manipulated to suit the foreigners' tastes.

Varieties

Kimchi is one of the most important staples of Korean cuisine. The Korean term "Kimchi" refers to fermented vegetables, and encompasses salt and seasoned vegetables. It is mainly served as a side dish with every meal, but also can be served as a main dish. Kimchi is mainly recognized as a spicy fermented cabbage dish globally. 

New variations of kimchi continue to be created, and the taste can vary depending on the region and season. Conventionally, the secret of kimchi preparation was passed down by mothers to their daughters in a bid to make them suitable wives to their husbands. However, with the current technological advancement and increase in social media use, many individuals worldwide can now access recipes for kimchi preparation.

Kimchi can be categorized by main ingredients, regions or seasons. Korea's northern and southern sections have a considerable temperature difference. There are over 180 recognized varieties of kimchi. The most common kimchi variations are:
 Baechu-kimchi spicy napa cabbage kimchi, made from whole cabbage leaves
 Baechu-geotjeori unfermented napa cabbage kimchi
 Bossam-kimchi wrapped kimchi
 Baek-kimchi white kimchi, made without chili pepper
 Dongchimi a non-spicy watery kimchi
 Nabak-kimchi a mildly spicy watery kimchi
 Chonggak-kimchi cubed chonggak "ponytail" radish, a popular spicy kimchi
 Kkakdugi spicy cubed Korean radish strongly-scented kimchi containing fermented shrimp
 Oi-sobagi cucumber kimchi that can be stuffed with seafood and chili paste, and is a popular choice during the spring and summer seasons
 Pa-kimchi spicy green onion kimchi
 Yeolmu-kimchi is also a popular choice during the spring and summer, and is made with yeolmu radishes, and does not necessarily have to be fermented.
 Gat-kimchi, made with Indian mustard
 Yangbaechu-kimchi (양배추 김치) spicy cabbage kimchi, made from "headed" cabbage leaves (as opposed to napa cabbage)

Kimchi from the northern parts of Korea tends to have less salt and red chili and usually does not include brined seafood for seasoning. Northern kimchi often has a watery consistency. Kimchi made in the southern parts of Korea, such as Jeolla-do and Gyeongsang-do, uses salt, chili peppers and myeolchijeot (brined anchovy allowed to ferment) or saeujeot (brined shrimp allowed to ferment), myeolchiaekjeot, kkanariaekjeot, liquid anchovy jeot, similar to fish sauce used in Southeast Asia, but thicker.

Saeujeot or myeolchijeot is not added to the kimchi spice-seasoning mixture, but is simmered first to reduce odors, eliminate tannic flavor and fats, and then is mixed with a thickener made of rice or wheat starch. This technique has been falling into disuse in the past 40 years.

Color 
White kimchi is neither red nor spicy. It includes white napa cabbage kimchi and other varieties such as white radish kimchi (dongchimi). Watery white kimchi varieties are sometimes used as an ingredient in a number of dishes such as cold noodles in dongchimi brine (dongchimi-guksu).

Age 
 Geotjeori: fresh, unfermented kimchi.
 Mugeun-ji, also known as mugeun-kimchi: aged kimchi

Region

The following regional classification dates to the 1960s. Since then, kimchi-making practices and trends in Korea have diverged from it.
 Pyongan-do (North Korea, outside of Pyongyang): Non-traditional ingredients have been adopted in rural areas due to severe food shortages.
 Hamgyeong-do (Upper Northeast): Due to its proximity to the ocean, people in this particular region use fresh fish and oysters to season their kimchi.
 Hwanghae-do (Midwest): The taste of kimchi in Hwanghae-do is not bland but not extremely spicy. Most kimchi from this region has less color since red chili flakes are not used. The typical kimchi for Hwanghae-do is called hobakji (호박지). It is made with pumpkin (bundi).
 Gyeonggi-do (Lower Midwest of Hwanghae-do)
 Chungcheong-do (between Gyeonggi-do and Jeolla-do): Instead of using fermented fish, people in the region rely on salt and fermentation to make savory kimchi. Chungcheong-do has the most varieties of kimchi.
 Gangwon-do (South Korea)/Kangwon-do (North Korea) (Mideast): In Gangwon-do, kimchi is stored for longer periods. Unlike other coastal regions in Korea, kimchi in this area does not contain much salted fish.
 Jeolla-do (Lower Southwest): Salted yellow corvina and salted butterfish are used in this region to create different seasonings for kimchi.
 Gyeongsang-do (Lower Southeast): This region's cuisine is saltier and spicier. The most common seasoning components include myeolchijeot which produce a briny and savory flavor.
 Foreign countries: In some places of the world people sometimes make kimchi with western cabbage and many other alternative ingredients such as broccoli.

Seasonal variations
Different types of kimchi were traditionally made at different times of the year, based on when various vegetables were in season and also to take advantage of hot and cold seasons before the era of refrigeration. Although the advent of modern refrigeration – including kimchi refrigerators specifically designed with precise controls to keep different varieties of kimchi at optimal temperatures at various stages of fermentation – has made this seasonality unnecessary, Koreans continue to consume kimchi according to traditional seasonal preferences.

Spring
After a long period of consuming gimjang kimchi during the winter, fresh potherbs and vegetables were used to make kimchi. These kinds of kimchi were not fermented or even stored for long periods of time but were consumed fresh.

Summer

Yeolmu radishes and cucumbers are summer vegetables made into kimchi, yeolmu-kimchi which is eaten in several bites. Brined fish or shellfish can be added, and freshly ground dried chili peppers are often used.

Autumn
Baechu kimchi is prepared by inserting blended stuffing materials, called sok (literally inside), between layers of salted leaves of uncut, whole Napa cabbage. The ingredients of sok can vary, depending on the regions and weather conditions. Generally, baechu kimchi used to have a strong salty flavor until the late 1960s, before which a large amount of myeolchijeot or saeujeot had been used.

Gogumasoon Kimchi is made from sweet potato stems.

Winter
Traditionally, the greatest varieties of kimchi were available during the winter. In preparation for the long winter months, many types of kimjang kimchi were prepared in early winter and stored in the ground in large kimchi pots. Today, many city residents use modern kimchi refrigerators offering precise temperature controls to store kimjang kimchi. November and December are traditionally when people begin to make kimchi; women often gather together in each other's homes to help with winter kimchi preparations. "Baechu kimchi" is made with salted baechu filled with thin strips of radish, parsley, pine nuts, pears, chestnuts, shredded red pepper, manna lichen, garlic, and ginger.

Korean preference
As of 2004, the preference of kimchi preparation in Korean households from the most prepared type of kimchi to less prepared types of kimchi was: baechu kimchi, being the most prepared type of kimchi, then kkakdugi, then dongchimi and then chonggak kimchi. Baechu kimchi comprised more than seventy percent of marketed kimchi and radish kimchi comprised about twenty percent of marketed kimchi.

Dishes usually served with kimchi

As a traditional side dish, Kimchi is almost always served along with other side dishes in most Korean family households and restaurants. Kimchi can be eaten alone or with white or brown rice, but it is also included in recipes of other traditional dishes, including porridges, soups, and rice cakes. Kimchi is also the basis for many derivative dishes such as kimchi stew, kimchi pancake, kimchi soup, and kimchi fried rice. 

Army base stew is a popular dish made with spam, sausage, and kimchi. It originated after the Korean war based on ingredients scrounged from the army.

Nutrition

Kimchi is made of various vegetables and contains a high concentration of dietary fiber, while being low in calories. The vegetables used in kimchi also contribute to intake of vitamin A, thiamine (B1), riboflavin (B2), calcium, and iron.

A 2003 article said that South Koreans consume 18kg (40lbs) of kimchi per person annually. Many credit the Korean Miracle in part to eating the dish.

Trade
South Korea spent around $129 million in 2017 to purchase 275,000 metric tons of foreign kimchi, more than 11 times the amount it exported, according to data released by the Korea Customs Service in 2017. South Korea consumes 1.85 million metric tons of kimchi annually, or 36.1 kg per person. It imports a significant fraction of that, mostly from China, and runs a $47.3 million kimchi trade deficit.

Food regulations 
The Canadian Food Inspection Agency has regulations for the commercial production of kimchi. The final product should have a pH ranging from 4.2 to 4.5. Any low-acidity ingredients with a pH above 4.6, including white daikon and napa cabbage, should not be left under conditions that enable the growth of undesirable microorganisms and require a written illustration of the procedure designed to ensure this is available if requested. This procedural design should include steps that maintain sterility of the equipment and products used, and the details of all sterilization processes. The cutoff pH of 4.6 is a value common to many food safety regulations, initially defined because botulism toxin is not produced below this level.

Gallery

See also
 
 
 
 
 
 
 
  – a variety of kimchi made of carrots by Koryo-saram
 
 
 
 .

References

Further reading

 
Banchan
Brassica dishes
Cabbage dishes
Korean cuisine
National dishes
Pickles